The Ewe and the Eye is an album by Mia Doi Todd, released in 1997 by Xmas Records.

Track listing
 "Digging"
 "Planting Time"
 "Stoke the Fire"
 "Blue Moon"
 "True Love"
 "Hills on Fire"
 "Nightblooming Trilogy"
 "Courting"
 "Set Sail"
 "Johnny Appleseed"
 "Autumn"

1997 albums
Mia Doi Todd albums